Rohini may refer to:

People
 Rohini (actress) (born 1969), Indian actress, screenwriter, and director
 Rohini (Buddha's disciple), female disciple
 Rohini (goddess), consort of Chandra
 Rohini (Krishna's wife), queen of Hindu god Krishna
 Rohini Devi, first consort of Vasudeva in Hindu mythology
 Rohini Hattangadi (born 1955), Indian actress

Places
 Rohini, West Bengal, a village in India
 Rohini, Delhi, a residential sub city in Northwest Delhi, India

Other
 Rohini (film), a 1953 Indian Tamil-language film directed by Kamal Ghosh
 Rohini (nakshatra), a lunar mansion in Indian astronomy corresponding to Aldebaran
 Rohini (satellite), a series of Indian space satellites
 Rohini sounding rocket series, Indian rockets developed for meteorological and atmospheric study purposes
 Rohini River, in South Central Nepal, tributary to the West Rapti River